The Necromancer is a 2005 horror novella by American writer Douglas Clegg. It is written in the form of a diary as first-person narrative.

Plot
The story revolves around Justin Gravesand, a boy who believes his late twin brother was murdered by his father. Brought up in a Catholic background, Justin sets out to find the truth. He dug up his brothers bones.

In his youth, Justin takes interest in sexual pleasures and has intercourse with his school teacher. Later Justin became interested in learning and became a scholar.

He then visits a brothel with his friends James and Wendy and meets Anya, James' beautiful girlfriend. He confronted the owner of the club, who identifies himself as the necromancer or the master. He then experiences hallucinations regarding sex with corpses.

In the end, Justin communicates with his brother through necromancy and learns that he had killed his own brother with a sharp object. The novella ends as Justin becomes the necromancer, "I am the monster. I am necromancer himself."
 

2005 American novels
American novellas